Jorge Cevallos (born June 16, 1994) is a Mexican racing driver from Tijuana, Baja California who resides in San Diego, California. He is a part of the Escuderia Telmex program which is responsible for F1 drivers Sergio Pérez, and Esteban Gutiérrez.

Career

2008-2011 Karting

Cevallos started karting in 2008 in the SDKA (San Diego Karting Association) regional championship, taking 3rd place in HPV-2 Juniors in his rookie campaign. He then moved on to racing  with Buddy Rice Karting where he took 4th in the IKF Grand Nationals in 2010 and was also selected to represent team Mexico in the Rotax World Finals in La Conca, Italy. 2011 his success continued with Buddy Rice Karting as he moved into the Senior Max Division where he took podiums in Rotax Challenge of the Americas, Panamerican Championships, and Gatorz Karting Cup.

2012-2013 Protyre Formula Renault UK

In 2012 Cevallos moved into the European Single Seater racing scene with a strong rookie campaign in the highly competitive Protyre Formula Renault Championship. Racing for Mtech-Lite, he led the way finishing ahead of his 3 team-mates to take 12th in the championship. His strongest point came at Thruxton qualifying 4th and finishing 6th, he would then match 6th place at croft after starting 12th.

In 2013 Jorge returned to Protyre Formula Renault with Mark Godwin Motorsport, the team which took Josh Webster to 2nd place in 2012. Immediately he showed his speed by taking a win at the opening round, and 4 podiums throughout the season. His remarkable consistency with 9 top 5 finished earned him 3rd place in the championship standings.

2014 Formula Renault 2.0
Cevallos competed in seven races in the 2014 Formula Renault 2.0 Northern European Cup with Fortec Motorsports. He left the series after the Hockhenheim round. He finished 25th in points with a best finish of 10th in the second race at the Silverstone Circuit. He also competed in the Circuit de Spa-Francorchamps round of the 2014 Formula Renault 2.0 Alps season as a guest driver, also with Fortec.

Cevallos did not race professionally in 2015 due to medical reasons to heal from surgery to treat Ulcerative colitis, which he was diagnosed with in early 2014.

2016 Pro Mazda Championship
Cevallos will return to professional racing in the 2016 Pro Mazda Championship driving for CAPE Motorsports.

Racing record

Career summary

Pro Mazda Championship

* Season still in progress

References

External links
 
 

1994 births
Living people
Racing drivers from Baja California
Mexican racing drivers
People from Tijuana
Formula Renault 2.0 NEC drivers
Formula Renault 2.0 Alps drivers
FIA Institute Young Driver Excellence Academy drivers
LATAM Challenge Series drivers
Wayne Taylor Racing drivers
Fortec Motorsport drivers
Formula Renault BARC drivers
JDC Motorsports drivers